Ron Flowers is a former American football coach.  He served as the head football coach at Southwest State University—now known as Southwest Minnesota State University—in Marshall, Minnesota, for three seasons, from 1997 to 1999, compiling a record of 14–18.

Head coaching record

References

Year of birth missing (living people)
Living people
Southwest Minnesota State Mustangs football coaches